The Cider Press Review Book Award is an annual literary prize offered by the Cider Press Review. The prize recognizes outstanding poetry manuscripts. Winners receive a $1,500 cash prize, with their manuscripts published by Cider Press. The book award has become a magnet for promising poets and well-known judges from various literary fields.

Past winners 
 2007 Robin Chapman, Abundance
 2008 Carol Quinn, Acetylene
 2009 Landon Godfrey, Second-Skin Rhinestone-Spangled Nude Souffle Chiffon Gown
 2010 Liz Robbins, Play Button
 2011 Joseph Fasano, Fugue for Other Hands
 2012 Lorraine Doran, Phrasebook for the Pleiades

Past judges and reviewers 
The Cider Press Review Book Award is chosen by guest judges and reviewers from various fields of poetry and literature. These participants have included Gray Jacobik, Jeanne Marie Beaumont, and David St. John.

References 

American poetry awards
Awards established in 2007